Alice Muthoni Gichuru, who writes as Muthoni wa Gichuru, is a Kenyan writer of fiction for children and young adults, as well as short stories.

Life
Muthoni wa Gichuru grew up in Matanya, a small village in Nanyuki. As a child she recalls her father reading to her from a Gikuyu book titled Kamina na Kamina. She holds a Bachelor of Science degree in information sciences from Moi University. 

Gichuru's husband, Joseph Kamau, encouraged her to start writing stories in 2002. Her first published book, Breaking the Silence (2009), was runner-up for the 2011 Jomo Kenyatta Prize for Literature in the English-language youth category. The Carving (2019) was the winner of the 2018 CODE Burt Prize for African Young Adult Literature in Kenya.

Works
 Breaking the Silence. Nairobi: East African Educational Publishers, 2009. 
 The Hidden Package. Nairobi, Kenya: East African Educational Publishers Ltd., 2016.
  The Other side and Other stories : Nairobi, Kenya:Storymoja Publishers., 2016
  The Bitter Sweet and Other Stories  : Nairobi, Kenya:Storymoja Publishers., 2016
  The Scary Trip and Other Stories  : Nairobi, Kenya:Storymoja Publishers., 2016
 Beyond the Barricades. Nairobi, Kenya: East African Educational Publishers Limited, 2016.
 Moon Scapes: Short Stories and Poetry. 2017.
 The Carving. Nairobi, Kenya : Longhorn Publishers, 2019.
  Smart Sidi and the Poem. Nairobi, Kenya : Longhorn Publishers, 2019.
  Smart Sidi and the lost ball. Nairobi, Kenya : Longhorn Publishers, 2019.
  Smart Sidi and the play house. Nairobi, Kenya : Longhorn Publishers, 2019.
  Kefa's Quest. Phoenix Arizona, USA : Worlds Unknown Publishers, 2020.

References

Year of birth missing (living people)
Living people
Kenyan children's writers
Kenyan women children's writers
21st-century Kenyan writers
21st-century Kenyan women writers
Moi University alumni